Vladimir Borisovich Zarudnitsky (born 6 February 1958) is a Russian Ground Forces colonel general and the chief of the Military Academy of the General Staff of the Armed Forces of Russia.

Zarudnitsky served in the Soviet Army from the 1970s and became a junior officer in the Group of Soviet Forces in Germany, commanding a platoon, company, and intelligence regiment. After his 1989 graduating from the Frunze Military Academy, Zarudnitsky became chief of staff of a regiment and a regimental commander in the Far Eastern Military District. He then served as chief of staff and commander of a motor rifle brigade in the North Caucasus Military District. After graduating from the Military Academy of the General Staff in 2003, Zarudnitsky became commander of the 27th Guards Motor Rifle Division. He served as a chief of staff and commander of the 36th Army in the Siberian Military District before becoming chief of staff of the Moscow Military District. In March 2011 he became deputy commander of the Southern Military District. In September of that year, Zarudnitsky became head of the Main Operational Directorate and deputy chief of the General Staff. In June 2014, he became commander of the Central Military District. He was transferred to become chief of the Military Academy of the General Staff in November 2017.

Early life and Soviet military career 
Zarudnitsky was born on 6 February 1958 in Abinsk. After entering the military in 1975, he graduated from the Ordzhonikidze Higher Military Command School in 1979. Between 1979 and 1985, he commanded a platoon and then a company in the Group of Soviet Forces in Germany. Between 1985 and 1987, he was head of an intelligence regiment in the GSFG. In 1989, Zarudnitsky graduated from the Frunze Military Academy.

Career in the Russian Ground Forces 

From 1991 to 1994, Zarudnitsky served as chief of staff of a regiment and later commanded a regiment in the Far Eastern Military District. In 1997, Zarudnitsky became chief of staff of the 131st Motor Rifle Brigade at Maykop. He took command of the brigade in 1999, leading it in the Second Chechen War. Zarudnitsky entered the Military Academy of the General Staff, graduating in 2003 with honors. He became commander of the 27th Guards Motor Rifle Division in the Volga–Urals Military District. In January 2005, he became chief of staff and first deputy commander of the 36th Army in the Siberian Military District. In February 2007, he became commander of the army. In April 2009, Zarudnitsky became chief of staff and first deputy commander of the Moscow Military District. In March 2011, he became deputy commander of the Southern Military District. On 3 October, he became head of the Main Operational Directorate and deputy chief of the General Staff. On 10 December 2013, Zarudnitsky was awarded the Order of Military Merit.

On 12 June 2014, Zarudnitsky was appointed commander of the Central Military District. On 22 November 2017, he was appointed chief of the Military Academy of the General Staff.

Personal life 
Zarudnitsky is married and has a son and a daughter.

References 

1958 births
Living people
Soviet Army officers
Russian colonel generals
Recipients of the Order of Military Merit (Russia)
People from Krasnodar Krai
Frunze Military Academy alumni
Military Academy of the General Staff of the Armed Forces of Russia alumni